Royston Wee (born November 15, 1986) is a Singaporean mixed martial artist, currently competing as a bantamweight. Wee most recently competed in the Ultimate Fighting Championship (UFC). He is noted for being the first and only Singaporean fighter to be signed by the company. He trains out of and teaches MMA at Impact Mixed Martial Arts gym in Singapore.

Education 
Wee studied computer engineering at polytechnic.

Wee earned a double major in management and in marketing at Murdoch University in 2013.

MMA career 
Wee initially trained in Muay Thai, and then started training at Fight G in Singapore. Two years later he started training MMA at Impact MMA.

The Ultimate Fighter
In July 2013, Royston tried out for The Ultimate Fighter: China when tryouts were held in Singapore. Royston had only previously competed at flyweight, but the lightest weight class available for the tryouts was featherweight.

Ultimate Fighting Championship
Shortly thereafter Royston was signed by the UFC on a multi-fight contract. In his debut, he defeated Dave Galera by decision at UFC Fight Night 34 on January 4, 2014.

In his second bout with the promotion, Wee faced Yao Zhikui on August 23, 2014 at UFC Fight Night: Bisping vs. Le.  He won via split decision, sustaining a broken nose in the fight.

Wee faced Ning Guangyou on May 16, 2015 at UFC Fight Night 66. He lost the fight via TKO in the second round and was subsequently released from the promotion on September 2, 2015.

Mixed martial arts record

|-
|Loss
|align=center|4–1
|Ning Guangyou
| TKO (punches and elbows)
|UFC Fight Night: Edgar vs. Faber
|
|align=center|2
|align=center|4:59
|Pasay, Philippines
|
|-
|Win
|align=center|4–0
|Yao Zhikui
|Decision (split)
|UFC Fight Night: Bisping vs. Le
|
|align=center|3
|align=center|5:00
|Macau, SAR, China
|
|-
|Win
|align=center|3–0
|Dave Galera
|Decision (unanimous)
|UFC Fight Night: Saffiedine vs. Lim
|
|align=center|3
|align=center|5:00
|Marina Bay, Singapore
|
|-
|Win
|align=center|2–0
|Syed Shahir
|Submission (rear-naked choke)
|Malaysian Fighting Championship 3
|
|align=center|1
|align=center|1:44
|Kuala Lumpur, Malaysia
|
|-
|Win
|align=center| 1–0
|Mohammad Irfan
|Submission
|Malaysian Fighting Championship 2
|
|align=center|1
|align=center|1:05
|Kuala Lumpur, Malaysia
|
|}

See also
 List of male mixed martial artists

References

External links
 
 

1986 births
Living people
Singaporean male mixed martial artists
Bantamweight mixed martial artists
Mixed martial artists utilizing Brazilian jiu-jitsu
Singaporean practitioners of Brazilian jiu-jitsu
Ultimate Fighting Championship male fighters